The murder of a non-formal teacher named Itishree Pradhan in the remote village of Tikiri under Kashipur Block in the Rayagada district generated nationwide uproar and consternation. This is one of the rare cases where Central Bureau of Investigation has not been able to trace out the main accused.

Background
The allegations as described in the criminal case record (C.T.No.48 of 2014 on the file of the Sessions Judge, Rayagada) are that one Itishree Pradhan, a contractual government  teacher of Project U.P.School, Tikiri, was harassed by one Netrananda Dandosena, S.I. of schools of Kasipur Block who happens to be the ex-Headmaster of the school. Unable to bear the harassment anymore, the victim lodged written reports against the accused as well as his family members. Apparently no action was taken against the culprits. The victim made representations to various authorities and organizations for her redress. Meanwhile, the accused went on harassing her in various ways to back off or withdrawal of the complaints.  The allegations further disclose that on 27.10.2013 at about 9.20 PM when the victim was listening to music, an unknown culprit entered the room of the victim and threatened her to withdraw the cases against the accused persons. When she declined, the culprit poured kerosene on her & set her ablaze. A very badly burnt Itishree was taken to the PHC, Tikiri. The Medical Officer administered preliminary treatments and apprehending her imminent demise, recorded her dying declaration. The victim was referred to District Headquarters Hospital for specialized treatment. The matter was reported to Police and the Tahasildar-cum-Executive Magistrate, Rayagada also recorded a dying declaration. The deceased was thereafter referred to Seven Hills Hospital at Visakhapatnam where she succumbed to the severe burns on 01.11.2013 at 11.14 A.M.

Investigation
The inaction of the local government officials was highly blamed as media highlighted the issue. The State Government directed the CID (CB) to investigate the case. Accused Netrananda Dondosena was charge sheeted who faced trial in C.T. No. 48 of 2014 on the file of the Sessions Judge, Rayagada. The Apex Court, basing on a PIL filed by one Sudeepta Lenka, law graduate from Bengalure, directed further investigation by CBI to apprehend the main accused in the case.

Judgment
The accused was held guilty of the offences U/sec. 120(B) of the IPC for having conspired to murder the deceased punishable u/sec 302 of the IPC.  The trying Judge observed in the judgment that the convict deserves exemplary punishment to serve as a deterrent to potential conspirators and accordingly sentenced him to undergo imprisonment for life on 26.04.2016.

References

Indian murder victims
People murdered in India